Ola Bola is a 2016 Malaysian sports football film directed by Chiu Keng Guan. The film was inspired by the glories of the Malaysia national football team which successfully entered the 1980 Summer Olympics. The film was released in Malaysian cinemas on 28 January 2016. As of November 2019, Ola Bola is currently ranked the tenth-highest grossing Malaysian film of all-time.

Plot
A journalist, Marianne is commissioned to research the Malaysia national football team of the 80's. Disillusioned by her working life in Malaysia, she decides to emigrate to England once she completes the project. She goes to Sabah to interview Eric, a former player of the team.

In 1980, the team practises for the upcoming pre-Olympics matches, with captain Chow Kwok Keong serving as the interim coach until Harry Mountain takes over. Meanwhile, aspiring sports commentator and Chow's friend, Rahman practises with his mentors. Mountain revises the formation, such as by having Eric being changed from a reserve goalkeeper to a striker. Having not getting used to the new formation, and also due to Chow disobeying the coach's orders, the team is unable to win any friendly matches. Soon, Eric and fellow striker Ali have a falling out over the squad number 10. Chow assumes responsibility for their embarrassing performance and quits the team.

The team continues on their losing streak. In the meantime, the three younger brothers of Muthu the goalkeeper are injured in an attempt to help their father deliver coconuts by driving the lorry. Fed up with Muthu's (fruitless) football endeavours and him not being able to help with work, Muthu's father reprimands him. Muthu contemplates also about quitting the team out of perceived incompetence, but does not do so.

Chow remembers his pledge to lead the team to glory and decides to rejoin the team. Mountain welcomes him back and advises him to "not make the same mistakes I did when I was younger." After extensive practice and military training, the team finally starts winning again.

Malaysia competes with South Korea at Stadium Merdeka in the final match, where Rahman is assigned to commentate. In the first half, an opponent informs Ali that Malaysia is boycotting the Olympics. During the half-time break, Ali shares the news to his teammates' disappointment. Mountain and Chow knew about this all along, but could not disclose it lest team morale be affected. Not willing to give up, Muthu encourages them to play on resolutely regardless whether they make it to Moscow. They display excellent skill and teamwork later on as Rahman delivers a thrilling and emphatic commentary. Ali scores the decisive goal; they win 3–2.

In the present day, Marianne gets the now-elderly Chow on television and has changed her mind about leaving. In a post-credits scene, she tells her boss Rahman that she knows his "secret": his past career as football commentator.

Cast

Main cast 
 JC Chee (朱俊丞) as Chow Kwok Keong/Tauke（周国强）(Soh Chin Aun motive)
 Muhd Luqman Hafidz bin Mohd Fauzi as Ahmad Ali (Hassan Sani motive)
 Sarankumar a/l Manokaran as Muthu Kumar (The late R. Arumugam motive) 
 Bront Palarae as Rahman (Rahim Razali motive)
 Marianne Tan Poh Yee (陈宝仪) as Marianne

Supporting cast 
 Lim Jian Wen (林健文) as Yap Tiam Cai（叶添财）
 Eric Teng Shin Wang (丁行旺) as Eric Yong (James Wong motive)
 Daphne Low Sin Mun (刘倩妏) as Chow Mei Ling（周美玲）
 Mark Williams as Harry Mountain (The late Karl-Heinz Weigang motive)
 Mohamad Taufiq Hanafi as Mohamad Abu (Shukor Salleh motive)
 Katrina Ho Fooi Tin (何蒉町) as Tan Siew Lee（陈秀丽）
 Ganasen a/l Thanimalai as Ali's colleague

Special appearance 
 Soh Chin Aun as Chow Kok Keong (modern-day)（周国强-老年）
 Lee Chwee Sieang as Tan Siew Lee (modern-day)（陈秀丽-老年）
 Rahim Razali as Rahman's sports commentator superior
 Markus Wehner Glæsel
 Janus Emil Mariager

Cameo appearance 
 Frankie Lee Sai Peng (李世平) as security guard

Production

Original soundtrack

The original soundtrack for the movie, Arena Cahaya is written and performed by Zee Avi. The song is co-produced by Zee and Rendra Zawawi. The song is the winner of the "Best Original Theme Song" category in the Taipei Golden Horse Film Festival in 2016 This song also won the "Best Original Theme Song" award at the 28th Malaysia Film Festival held on 3 September 2016.

Reception

Box-office 
The film opened to 120 theatres across Malaysia and earned approximately RM2.5 million for the first 4 days of its release. The figure had accumulated to around RM8 million thirteen days later.

Thomas Schmid, who wrote for Film Journal International, had reported that the film had supposedly failed to reach Malaysia's top 20 box-office, performing "relatively slowly" compared with other recent foreign blockbusters despite banking on director Keng's success with his previous work The Journey.  However, local entertainment portal The Daily Seni refuted this claim, providing their own figures for the film with approximately RM15.3 million as of early March 2016. The portal further explained that the film's supposed flop was due to weekly Malaysian box office reports being never disclosed to the public.

Accolades

Controversies

Plot discrepancy 
Some members of the public, including two key players in the Malaysian team that qualified for that Olympics, voiced concerns over the potential confusion that may arise from the distortion of certain facts depicted in the movie. That includes the actual scoreline and the player scoring the winning goal in the qualifier against South Korea.

The production team has since clarified that the plot is "inspired by a true story" as mentioned in the opening scene of the movie, and is not meant to be a historical account.

Disqualification in the 28th Malaysia Film Festival 
Ola Bola became a subject of public outrage when it became one of the high-profile films to be disqualified from the Best Film shortlist in the 28th Malaysia Film Festival and lumped in the controversial Non-Bahasa Malaysia categories by the award organisers National Film Development Corporation (FINAS) and Film Producers Association Malaysia (PFM), because it contained less than 70% Bahasa Malaysia dialogue.

The action was deemed to be a "racist" move, as claimed by the president of the Selangor and Kuala Lumpur Screenwriters Association (PENULIS), Alfie Palermo. Filmmaker Afdlin Shauki announced on his Facebook page of his boycott to express his dissatisfaction, which was supported by CIMB Group chairman Nazir Razak and Air Asia CEO Tony Fernandes. One participating cinematographer, Mohd Noor Kassim, also followed suit; withdrawing his nominations in the occasion and returned two FFM trophies he won in previous editions to FINAS director Kamil Othman during a forum held by the agency in Kuala Lumpur. There had also been calls from both within and out of the film industry to boycott the award ceremony. The assistant-general secretary of the Film Directors’ Association of Malaysia (FDAM) Hafiz Ibrahim resigned in protest of the unfair segregation.

FINAS has since revamped the category system under instructions from Multimedia and Communications Minister Datuk Seri Salleh Said Keruak on 10 August. All non-Bahasa Malaysia categories were removed and nominees were eligible to compete for Best Film, Director and Screenplay in the original category, where a new category - Best Film in the National Language - is established in their place, where nominees that meet a 70% Bahasa Malaysia requirement can compete in this particular category.

References

External links
 
 Official site

Malay-language films
Films set in Malaysia
Malaysian association football films
Sports films based on actual events
Films about the 1980 Summer Olympics
Films shot in Malaysia
Astro Shaw films
English-language Malaysian films
Chinese-language Malaysian films
Tamil-language Malaysian films
Films directed by Chiu Keng Guan
Malaysian multilingual films
2016 multilingual films